Kashmiri handicrafts is a traditional art of Kashmiri people and artisans who make, craft, and decorate objects by hand. Srinagar, Ganderbal, and Budgam are the main districts in central Kashmir which have been making handicrafts products since ages. The rest of its districts, including Srinagar, Ganderbal, and Budgam are best known for its cultural heritage which extends handicraft industry in Jammu and Kashmir, India.

The artistry of Kashmir with Palkis, bedsheets, trunks, inkstands, boxes, and spoons are famous all over India, furthermore, the shawl making is exceptional. Kashmiris make different types of handicraft products with simple items and  materials traditionally. Some notable areas are textiles, carpets and rugs, crewel embroidery, phool kari, silverware, woodwork and papier-mâché, etc.

Handicraft is a source of living for many artisans in Kashmir.

Kashmir papier-mâché 
Kashmir papier-mâchéis, a craft that was brought by Muslim saint Mir Sayyid Ali Hamadani from Persia in the 14th century to medieval India. It is based primarily on paper pulp, and is a richly decorated, colourful artefact; generally in the form of vases, bowls, or cups (with and without metal rims), boxes, trays, bases of lamps, and many other small objects.

Kashmir walnut wood carving 
Kashmir walnut wood carving is a craft of fine wood carving. The Juglans regia tree that grows widely in Kashmir region is used for wood carving, and Kashmir is one of a few places for availability of walnut trees. Walnut wood is used to make tables, jewelry boxes, trays, etc.

Clothing 
Kashmir was the center for woolen materials. Various kinds of shawls were a popular product of Kashmir.

Kashmir shawl 
Shawls have been a foreign import to Kashmir by Muslim craftsmen from Turkestan as late as the 15th century.  Persian masters were brought by the third Mughal emperor Akbar, that improved the local craft and techniques of shawl and carpet weaving.

The Kashmir shawl is a type of shawl distinctive for its Kashmiri weave, and traditionally made of shahtoosh or pashmina wool.

Pashmina or Kar Amir 

The majority of the woollen fabrics of Kashmir, and particularly the best quality shawls, were and are still made of Pashm or Pashmina, which is the wool of Capra hircus, a species of the wild Asian mountain goat. Hence the shawls came to be called Pashmina.

Do-Shalla 

The Emperor Akbar was a great admirer of the shawls of Kashmir. It was he who began the fashion of wearing them in duplicate, sewn back to back, so that the under surfaces of the shawls were never seen. During that time the most desired shawls were those worked in gold and silver thread or shawls with border ornamented with fringes of gold, silver and silk thread.

The Do-shala, as the name designates ("two-shawl"), are always sold in pairs, there being many varieties of them. In the Khali-matan the central field is quite plain and without any ornamentation.

Kani Shawl 

Kani shawl is another type of Kashmir shawl originating from the Kanihama area of Kashmir. It is one of the oldest handicraft of Kashmir. This craft has been a part of the valley since the time of Mughals. The shawls are woven from pashmina yarn.

Carpets, rugs and mats 
Carpets are said to have originated from the oases and villages of Central Asia. The carpet weaving became a gift of these trading caravans to Kashmir. Kashmir produces several varieties of handmade, handknotted floor coverings items such as carpets and rugs. Another widely used way to produce carpets was and is by the felting of wool.

Namda 

Namda is a traditional Kashmiri carpet produced by felting wool instead of weaving woollen threads. Wool that comes directly from the fleece of living sheep, is being sorted out, cleaned, dyed and than many layers are mingled together, soaped and felted. Later the rug is decorated with chain stitch Aari embroidery with contrasting dyed threads. Or decoreated with pieces of feIt.

Nomadic farming tribes of the Central Asian steppes and mountains knew the technique of felting already in the late Iron age and felted carpets are still part of the culture of countries such as Kirgizstan, Kazakhstan, Uzbekistan, Mongolia, parts of Pakistan, and Turkey. In India, the namda became popular during the time of the Mughal emperor Akbar (1556-1605). It is said that he was so much impressed by a namda given as a present to shield his horse from the cold, that the emperor granted the namda-maker, Nubi large swathes of land.

The Ministry of Skill Development and Entrepreneurship is promoting the craft, expecting to benefit the over 2,000 artisans of the 30 namda clusters from Kashmir.

Qaleen 

Qaleen (Kaleen, Kalin, قالین) is a type of hand knotted piled carpet. It is a product of Kashmiri handicraft, these are handknotted intricately designed piled carpets made with wool or silk. Sultan Zain-ul-Abidin king Budshah introduced "Kal baffi" craft (hand knotted carpets) from Persia to Kashmir in 15th century. Sultan brought carpet weavers from Persia and central Asia in to Kashmir to train the local inhabitants.

Wagoo 

Wagoo (also waguv or waggu) is a Kashmiri mat made of reeds.  Wagoo was made by hand-knotting. Wagoo is a part of Kashmiri culture and heritage. Wagoo were regularly used in households in the Kashmir Valley.

Sultan Zain-ul-Abidin brought carpet weavers to Kashmir. Kal baff's used to weave wagoo and eventually it become famous in Kashmir in the 15th century.

Embroidery work 
Embroidery is an integral part of many Kashmiri handicrafts, shawls, carpets and Kashmiri ladies pheran are adorned with intricate embroideries or flower styles made of thin metal threads and this kind of embroidery is known as 'Tille' in Kashmiri language. Embroidery work is done by both men in women in the region conventionally.

Crewel embroidery

Stone crafting 
Kashmiri artisans had very swift and neat hands in wood carving, stonework, stone polishing, glass blowing, and willow work. François Bernier appreciated Kashmiri's craft when he wrote in 1663. Stone crafting in Kashmir is very old; exceptional examples of beautiful architect and sculptures were crafted. Few examples are grand structures of the temples at Martand, Avantipur, Pariharpur, Patan, etc.

Role of Kashmiri handicrafts in economy
The handicraft industry remained an important key in the economic development of J&K and the industry has a great handout towards employment opportunities. Handmade products are exported all over India and other parts of the world. Kashmiri handicrafts eliminated financial crises among those people who are affected with the physical disabilities. After handicrafts gained foreign exposure with positive feedback, many youth made this, their profession. Kashmiri Handicrafts is the second largest and preferable industry after fruit in Kashmir Valley.

See also 
 Rafoogar
Wagoo

References 

Source
 

Pakistani clothing
Indian clothing
Pakistani culture
Indian handicrafts
Culture of Jammu and Kashmir
Cultural heritage of India
Pakistani handicrafts